The Intercontinental Handball Cup was a competition between the continental handball champions in the years which were not a World Men's Handball Championship and the host country.

History 
The idea of a Intercontinental Cup was first introduced in the 1980s but was delayed because of financial and temporal problems. In 1966 the IHF Congress created the IHF Men's Super Globe and the Intercontinental Handball Cup. After the third edition the tournament was cancelled because a fully packed calendar.

Tournaments

Medal count

References

 
International Handball Federation competitions
International handball competitions